Circular Road is a cricket ground in Belfast, Northern Ireland.

History
The home ground of the C.I.Y.M.S. Cricket Club, Circular Road has held one major cricket match, when Northern Knights played North West Warriors in a Twenty20 match as part of the 2017 Inter-Provincial Trophy. Northern Knights won the match by six wickets, with James Shannon contributing 62 runs in the Knights chase.

See also
List of Northern Knights grounds
List of cricket grounds in Ireland

References

External links
Circular Road at CricketArchive

Cricket grounds in Northern Ireland
Sports venues in Belfast